St. Joseph's College of Balanga (SJCB) is a Catholic private college located in Balanga, Bataan, Philippines. It is managed by the  Franciscan Sisters of the Immaculate Conception.

The college is the third branch of four St. Joseph's Colleges (the other three are from E. Rodriguez Blvd, Quezon City; Mactan, Cebu and Toril, in Davao City).

History
St. Joseph's College was founded by then Most Reverend Bishop Socrates B. Villegas, DD when he was the newly installed bishop of the Roman Catholic Diocese of Balanga (now the Archbishop of the Archdiocese of Lingayen-Dagupan) in 2006 with then SFIC Provincial Superior Sr. Josephini P. Ambatali, SFIC. It is the first Catholic school in Balanga.

The school pioneers were Sr. Teresita C. Babaran as directress, Sr. Agnes Labitoria as principal, Sr. Annalisa Cabrera as guidance counselor, Sr. Josefina Miguel as health officer, Sr. Lolita Oria as CFP teacher, Sr. Redempta Navalta as sewing room manager and Sr. Jocelyn Sulse as bookkeeper.

Degree programs 
 Bachelor of Arts
 Philosophy, the first ever course offered in the province
 Psychology
 Bachelor of Science
 Secondary & Elementary Education (with major in special education, values education and mathematics)
 Social Work

References

Universities and colleges in Bataan
Education in Balanga, Bataan
Educational institutions established in 2006
Franciscan universities and colleges
Catholic universities and colleges in the Philippines
2006 establishments in the Philippines